Plato is a city in eastern McLeod County, Minnesota, United States. The population was 320 at the 2010 census.

History
A post office called Plato has been in operation since 1858. The city was named for Plato, a Greek philosopher.

Geography

The community lies one half mile north of U.S. Highway 212 on a county road between Glencoe to the west and Norwood to the east. Buffalo Creek flows past the northwest of the community and the dry Kinneson Lakebed lies to the east and northeast.

Demographics

2010 census
At the 2010 census, there were 320 people, 139 households and 97 families residing in the city. The racial makeup of the city was 98.1% White, 0.3% Native American, 0.6% Asian, and 0.9% from other races. Hispanic or Latino of any race were 0.9% of the population.

There were 139 households, of which 23.0% had children under the age of 18 living with them, 61.9% were married couples living together, 4.3% had a female householder with no husband present, 3.6% had a male householder with no wife present, and 30.2% were non-families. 23.7% of all households were made up of individuals, and 8.7% had someone living alone who was 65 years of age or older. The average household size was 2.30 and the average family size was 2.72.

The median age was 44.6 years. 18.7% of residents were under the age of 18; 3.7% were between the ages of 18 and 24; 28.2% were from 25 to 44; 31.6% were from 45 to 64; and 17.8% were 65 years of age or older. The population was 50.6% male and 49.4% female.

2000 census
At the 2000 census, there were 336 people, 144 households and 99 families residing in the city. The racial makeup of the city was 98.81% White, 0.60% Asian, and 0.60% from two or more races.

There were 144 households, of which 29.9% had children under the age of 18 living with them, 61.1% were married couples living together, 7.6% had a female householder with no husband present, and 31.3% were non-families. 22.9% of all households were made up of individuals, and 11.8% had someone living alone who was 65 years of age or older. The average household size was 2.33 and the average family size was 2.76.

22.6% of the population were under the age of 18, 6.3% from 18 to 24, 32.1% from 25 to 44, 24.1% from 45 to 64, and 14.9% who were 65 years of age or older. The median age was 38 years. For every 100 females, there were 97.6 males. For every 100 females age 18 and over, there were 94.0 males.

The median household income was $55,179 and the median family income was $62,917. Males had a median income of $36,250 compared with $29,018 for females. The per capita income was $24,434. None of the families and 2.8% of the population were living below the poverty line, including no under eighteens and 7.1% of those over 64.

References

Cities in McLeod County, Minnesota
Cities in Minnesota